The Bateman Manuscript Project was a major effort at collation and encyclopedic compilation of the mathematical theory of special functions. It resulted in the eventual publication of five important reference volumes, under the editorship of Arthur Erdélyi.

Overview
The theory of special functions was a core activity of the field of applied mathematics, from the middle of the nineteenth century to the advent of high-speed electronic computing. The intricate properties of spherical harmonics, elliptic functions and other staples of problem-solving in mathematical physics, astronomy and right across the physical sciences, are not easy to document completely, absent a theory explaining the inter-relationships. Mathematical tables to perform actual calculations needed to mesh with an adequate theory of how functions could be transformed into those already tabulated.

Harry Bateman, a distinguished applied mathematician, undertook the somewhat quixotic task of trying to collate the content of the very large literature. On his death in 1946, his papers on this project were still in a uniformly rough state. The publication of the edited version provided special functions texts more up-to-date than, for example, the classic Whittaker & Watson.

The volumes were out of print for many years, and copyright in the works reverted to the California Institute of Technology, who renewed them in the early 1980s. Dover planned to reprint them for publication in 2007, but this never occurred . In 2011, the California Institute of Technology gave permission for scans of the volumes to be made publicly available.

Other mathematicians involved in the project include Wilhelm Magnus, Fritz Oberhettinger and Francesco Tricomi.

Askey–Bateman project
In 2007, the Askey–Bateman project was announced by Mourad Ismail as a five- or six-volume encyclopedic book series on special functions, based on the works of Harry Bateman and Richard Askey.

Starting in 2020, Cambridge University Press began publishing volumes 1 and 2 of this Encyclopedia of Special Functions with series editors Mourad Ismail and :

 Volume 1: Univariate Orthogonal Polynomials (editor: Mourad Ismail)
 Volume 2: Multivariable Special Functions (editors: Tom H. Koornwinder, Jasper V. Stokman)
 Volume 3: Hypergeometric and Basic Hypergeometric Functions (editor: Mourad Ismail)

Further volumes were considered to include topics such as:

 Continued fractions, number theory, and elliptic and theta functions
 Equations of mathematical physics, including continuous and discrete Painlevé, Lamé and Heun equations
 Transforms and related topics

See also
 Abramowitz and Stegun (AS)
 Jahnke and Emde (JE)
 Magnus and Oberhettinger (MO)
 NIST Handbook of Mathematical Functions
 Digital Library of Mathematical Functions (DLMF)

Bibliography
   (xxvi+4 errata pages+302 pages, red cloth hardcover) (NB. With a preface by Mina Rees and a foreword by Earnest C. Watson. Copyright was renewed by California Institute of Technology in 1981.); Reprint: Robert E. Krieger Publishing Co., Inc., Melbourne, Florida, USA. 1981. ; Planned Dover reprint . 
   (xvii+1 errata page+396 pages, red cloth hardcover) (NB. Copyright was renewed by California Institute of Technology in 1981.); Reprint: Robert E. Krieger Publishing Co., Inc., Melbourne, Florida, USA. 1981. ; Planned Dover reprint: .
   (xvii+292+2 pages, red cloth hardcover) (NB. Copyright was renewed by California Institute of Technology in 1983.); Reprint: Robert E. Krieger Publishing Co., Inc., Melbourne, Florida, USA. 1981. ; Planned Dover reprint .
   (xx+391 pages including 1 errata page, red cloth hardcover)
   (xvi+451 pages, red cloth hardcover)
  (1+6+111+1+1 pages)
  (343 pages, cloth hardcover)
  (327 pages, cloth hardcover)

References

Mathematics literature
Special functions
History of mathematics